The 2015 Australian Handball Club Championship is split into two parts. The first was the Beach Handball competition held in Glenelg, South Australia during February 2015 and the second is the Indoor titles which was held in March, 2015. Both were organised by the Australian Handball Federation and featured teams from New South Wales, Victoria, Queensland, Northern Territory, Australian Capital Territory, South Australia and hosts Western Australia.

The Beach tournament was split into Men's, Women's and Mixed. The men's title was won by the St Kilda from Victoria. The women's event was won by RUOK from Queensland and the mixed event was won by Spinners from New South Wales.

The Indoor tournament was split into two divisions. The Northern Division was won by Sydney University and the Southern Division by St Kilda HC. They won the right to represent Australia in the Oceania Handball Champions Cup.

Beach results

Men's final

Women's final

Mixed final

Men's indoor results

Northern conference

Round Robin

Southern Conference
1. St Kilda Handball Club
(results to follow)

Final

References

External links
 Beach Handball home page
 Indoor Northern Conference results

Handball competitions in Australia
Australian Handball Club Championship
Australian Handball Club Championship
Handball Club Championship